Frost Brown Todd LLP is a law firm based in the Southern and Midwestern United States.  It resulted from the 2000 merger of Frost & Jacobs LLP, a Cincinnati-based firm, with Brown Todd & Heyburn PLLC, a Louisville-based firm. It has over 575 attorneys working across 16 offices in California,Tennessee, Kentucky, Ohio, Indiana, Pennsylvania, Texas, Virginia, Washington, D.C., and West Virginia.

In January 2009, the firm merged with the Indianapolis-based law firm of Locke Reynolds LLP.

Awards and recognition 

 2019 Gold Standard Certification by the Women in Law Empowerment Forum
 HRC Best Places to Work 2020

References

External links
Frost Brown Todd website

Law firms based in Kentucky
Law firms based in Cincinnati
Companies based in Louisville, Kentucky
1919 establishments in Kentucky
Companies established in 1919